The 1976 Camel GT Challenge season was the 6th season of the IMSA GT Championship auto racing series.  The series was for GTO and GTU class Grand tourer racing cars.  It began on January 31, 1976, and ended on November 28, 1976, after fifteen rounds.

Schedule

Season results

External links
 World Sports Racing Prototypes - 1976 IMSA GT Championship results

IMSA GT Championship seasons
IMSA GT